Idaho is the forty-first richest state in the United States of America, with a per capita income of $17,841 (2000).

Idaho counties ranked by per capita income

Note: Data is from the 2010 United States Census Data and the 2006-2010 American Community Survey 5-Year Estimates.

References

Idaho
Locations
Income